Borislav Arapović (born Bišina Nevesinje, Kingdom of Yugoslavia, 11 April 1935) is a Bosnian-Croatian born poet, linguist, literary scholar and Bible translator. He adopted Swedish nationality and writes in Swedish and Croatian. In 1999 he was elected a foreign member of the Russian Academy of Sciences primarily for his services to minority languages.

Studies
Arapović studied at the Economic Faculty, University of Zagreb 1960-65. He came to Sweden as a refugee in 1965. He first got work at the retail chain Kooperativa Förbundet and then at IBM in Stockholm. Meanwhile, he was studying for a doctorate at the School of Slavonic and Baltic Languages, Stockholm University, (Ph.D. in Slavic languages 1984).

Institute for Bible Translation, 1973
Arapović founded the Institute for Bible Translation in Stockholm in 1973 to publish Bibles for "non-Slavic peoples in Slavic countries," and provide not just Bible translations into the languages of Russia but also Central Asian languages.

Poetry
His collection of poems Prolomom (2005) was awarded the Bosnia-Herzegovina Croatian Writers' Association's "Antun Branko Šimić Prize" in 2006.

Publications

Non-Fiction
 Dječja  Biblija (Children's Bible) with Vera Mattelmäki, 1983
 Miroslav Krleža Den kroatiske guden Mars ("The Croatian god Mars"): tillkomsthistoria,  Dissertation in Swedish, 1984.
 Östgötasonen : Karl Einar Johansson. ("Son of Östgötland") Swedish biography  Stockholm 1988
 Till alla tungomål och folk : Institutet för bibelöversättning 20 år, 1973-1993
 ("Biblical Silk Road - Memories of IBT 1973-1998.") Swedish 1997
 Hrvatski mirospis 1778.  1999.
 Krigsdimmor : från Kroatien och Bosnien-Hercegovina 1991-1995. - Stockholm : Codices, 2002
 Between despair and lamentation  Translated from Croatian by Ivana Pozajić Jerić Elmhurst College, 2002.  

Poetry (in Croatian)
 Zvončići ("Jingle Bells") 12 booklets of verses for children, 1977.
 Iz noćnog dnevnika 1989.
 Tamnionik 1992
 Kamenopis  1993
 Povratak hrvatskih pukovnija 1779.'' 2000
 Prolomom ("Fractures") Mostar Biblioteka Suvremenici

References

1935 births
Living people
People from Nevesinje
Croats of Bosnia and Herzegovina
20th-century Croatian poets
Swedish people of Bosnia and Herzegovina descent
Bible translators
Corresponding Members of the Russian Academy of Sciences
Foreign Members of the Russian Academy of Sciences
21st-century Croatian poets
Croatian-language poets
Swedish-language writers
Croatian male poets
20th-century Swedish male writers
21st-century male writers